Weston Underwood is a village and civil parish in the unitary authority area of the City of Milton Keynes, Buckinghamshire, England.  It is located about a mile west of Olney.

The village name 'Weston' is Anglo Saxon in origin, and means 'western estate', referring to the situation of the village in relation to Olney.  The affix 'Underwood' refers to the village's location to a nearby forest, possibly the Yardley Chase or Whittlewood.

Notable residents
A notable resident of the village for many years was William Cowper.

References

External links

 

Villages in Buckinghamshire
Areas of Milton Keynes
Civil parishes in Buckinghamshire